Lothar Hübner (26 October 1955 – 12 September 2022) was a German politician. A member of the Social Democratic Party of Germany, he served in the Landtag of Bavaria from January to October 1994.

Hübner died in Neustadt an der Aisch on 12 September 2022, at the age of 66.

References

1955 births
2022 deaths
Social Democratic Party of Germany politicians
Members of the Landtag of Bavaria
People from Neustadt (Aisch)-Bad Windsheim